Mohammad Monirul Islam is a Bangladesh Awami League politician who served as Member of Parliament for Jessore-2 from 2014 to 2018.

Career
Islam was elected to parliament from Jessore-2 on 5 January 2014 as a candidate of Bangladesh Awami League. The party did not renominate him for the 2018 Bangladeshi general election.

References

Awami League politicians
Living people
10th Jatiya Sangsad members
Year of birth missing (living people)